This is a list of produced films, TV series and animations by independent and privately run production company Scott Free Productions, currently headquartered in London and Los Angeles. Established in 1970 by brothers-filmmakers, Ridley and Tony Scott, currently run by David W. Zucker as CCO, Kevin J. Walsh as president, Michael Schaefer as producer and president, Mike Pruss as senior VP, Jack Arbuthnott as head of film, Kate Crowe as head of television and Carlo Dusi as head of business, owned by Ridley's larger company RSA Films. The company was formerly known as Scott Free Enterprises (1970-1980), Percy Main Productions (1980-1995; naming after the English village Percy Main, where their father grew up), Tony Scott Productions (1980-1995) and Ridley Scott Productions (1980-1995). The company has produced films ranging from the 2000 Hollywood blockbuster Gladiator (2000) to "smaller pictures" like Cracks (2009). Between productions of White Squall (1996) and G.I. Jane (1997), the company was reorganised by Ridley. In 2005, Numbers became the company's first hit series for television. The strategy repeated in 2009 when the company produced its second hit series The Good Wife. In 2012, Tony, who was one of the co-founders of the company, died.

Film

Television

Animation

Notes and references

External links 
 

Scott Free
S
Scott Free Productions films